The rule of law is the legal principle that law should govern a nation, with everyone equal before the law.

Rule of Law may also refer to:
Rule of Law (horse) (foaled 2001), a World Champion Thoroughbred racehorse
Rule of Law (Armenia), a political party in Armenia
Rule of Law Coalition, or State of Law Coalition, an Iraqi political coalition

See also
Rule of Law Initiative (disambiguation)